Metallolophia assamensis is a moth of the family Geometridae first described by Georges E. R. J. Orhant in 2000. It is found in Assam, India.

References

Moths described in 2000
Pseudoterpnini